Carter County is a county in the U.S. state of Oklahoma. As of the 2010 census, the population was 47,557. Its county seat is Ardmore. The county was named for Captain Ben W. Carter, a Cherokee who lived among the Chickasaw.

Carter County is part of the Ardmore Micropolitan Statistical Area. It is also a part of the Texoma region.

History
Prior to statehood, the present Carter County, Oklahoma, was part of Pickens County in the Chickasaw Nation of the Indian Territory.

After the Civil War, the government of the United States forced the Chickasaw government to allow railroads built across its territory. The Gulf, Colorado and Santa Fe Railway (controlled by the Atchison, Topeka and Santa Fe Railway, AT&SF) built a line north from Texas to Purcell.

In 1901-1903 the Arkansas and Choctaw Railway (acquired by the St. Louis and San Francisco Railway in 1907) built a line from Arkansas to Ardmore. Oil production spurred further railroad development. In 1913–14, the Oklahoma, New Mexico and Pacific Railway constructed a line from Ardmore west to Ringling. In 1916, the Ringling and Oil Fields Railway laid tracks north from Ringling Junction to Healdton. These last two rail lines were abandoned in 1976.

Oil and gas production began very early in the 20th century. The Healdton field opened in 1913, and led to the development of Ardmore as a major oil production center. However, a disastrous fire occurred in Ardmore in 1915, when a railroad car exploded, killing 43 people and destroying much of the downtown. Ardmore and the local oil industry recovered, and the city also became a manufacturing center. Akron Tire and Rubber Company built and operated a plant in Ardmore as early as 1915. In 1970, Uniroyal built a tire plant there. It was acquired by Michelin North America in 1990. By the start of the 21st century, manufacturing was the largest component of the county economy.

Geography

The county contains parts of several physiographic regions, including the Arbuckle Mountains, the Coastal Plains, the Red Bed plains and the Cross Timbers. The northern part of the county drains to the Washita River, while several creeks drain the southern part directly to the Red River.

Geology
The Healdton Field, encompassing Healdton and located in the western portion of Carter County, produces from the Pennsylvanian Healdton sands of the Hoxbar Group and the Ordovician massive carbonate Arbuckle Group.  The field is located on the "Healdton uplift", a northwest–southeast trending anticline, which formed with the Wichita Orogeny, and is 8 miles long and up to 3 miles wide.  This was followed by deposition of the Healdton sandstones and shales on pre-Pennsylvanian eroded rocks and subsequent folding during the Arbuckle Orogeny.  A prospector named Palmer drilled a shallow well, 425 feet, near an oil seep in the 1890s but Federal Law prohibited oil development on "Indian lands" until the early 1900s.  Therefore, the discovery of the field is credited to the drilling of No. 1 Wirt Franklin in 1913.

Major highways

  Interstate 35
  U.S. Highway 70
  U.S. Highway 70A
  U.S. Highway 77
  U.S. Highway 177
  State Highway 7
  State Highway 53
  State Highway 74
  State Highway 76
  State Highway 77S
  State Highway 142
  State Highway 199

Adjacent counties
 Garvin County (north)
 Murray County (northeast)
 Johnston County (east)
 Marshall County (southeast)
 Love County (south)
 Jefferson County (southwest)
 Stephens County (northwest)

Demographics

As of the census of 2000, there were 45,621 people, 17,992 households, and 12,648 families residing in the county.  The population density was 55 people per square mile (21/km2).  There were 20,577 housing units at an average density of 25 per square mile (10/km2).  The racial makeup of the county was 77.4% White, 7.60% Black or African American, 7.92% Native American, 0.60% Asian, 0.03% Pacific Islander, 1.13% from other races, and 4.45% from two or more races.  2.78% of the population were Hispanic or Latino of any race.

There were 17,992 households, out of which 32.50% had children under the age of 18 living with them, 54.50% were married couples living together, 12.00% had a female householder with no husband present, and 29.70% were non-families. 26.60% of all households were made up of individuals, and 12.20% had someone living alone who was 65 years of age or older.  The average household size was 2.47 and the average family size was 2.98.

In the county, the population was spread out, with 26.20% under the age of 18, 7.90% from 18 to 24, 26.70% from 25 to 44, 23.20% from 45 to 64, and 16.00% who were 65 years of age or older.  The median age was 38 years. For every 100 females, there were 92.90 males.  For every 100 females age 18 and over, there were 89.00 males.

The median income for a household in the county was $29,405, and the median income for a family was $36,729. Males had a median income of $30,018 versus $20,877 for females. The per capita income for the county was $15,511.  About 12.70% of families and 16.60% of the population were below the poverty line, including 21.70% of those under age 18 and 12.40% of those age 65 or over.

Politics

Communities

Cities
 Ardmore (county seat)
 Healdton
 Lone Grove
 Wilson

Towns
 Dickson
 Gene Autry
 Ratliff City
 Springer
 Tatums

Unincorporated communities

 Alpers
 Baum
 Brock
 Caldwell Hill
 Cheek
 Clemscott
 Countyline
 Dillard
 Dripping Springs
 Dundee
 Durwood
 Fox
 Glenn
 Graham
 Hewitt
 Milo
 Newport
 Oil City
 Old Scott
 Pooleville
 Post Oak
 Provence
 Pruitt City
 Reck
 Rexroat
 Tussy
 Wirt
 Woodford
 Zaneis

See also
 National Register of Historic Places listings in Carter County, Oklahoma

References

External links
 Healdton: Oklahoma's First State-Regulated Oil Field
 Carter County Government webpage
 Encyclopedia of Oklahoma History and Culture - Carter County
 Oklahoma Digital Maps: Digital Collections of Oklahoma and Indian Territory

 
1907 establishments in Oklahoma
Populated places established in 1907
Ardmore, Oklahoma micropolitan area